Thujopsene synthase (EC 4.2.3.79) is an enzyme with systematic name (2E,6E)-farnesyl diphosphate lyase (cyclizing, (+)-thujopsene-forming). This enzyme catalyses the following chemical reaction

 (2E,6E)-farnesyl diphosphate  (+)-thujopsene + diphosphate

The recombinant enzyme from the plant Arabidopsis thaliana produces (+)-α-barbatene, (+)-thujopsene and (+)-β-chamigrene.

References

External links 
 

EC 4.2.3